Loch Broom is a community in the Canadian province of Nova Scotia, located  in Pictou County. It is named after Loch Broom in Scotland.

References
 Loch Broom on Destination Nova Scotia

Communities in Pictou County
General Service Areas in Nova Scotia